Oestophora ortizi is a species of land snail in the family Trissexodontidae. It is endemic to Spain, where it is known only from Andalucia.

This snail is generally found in oak woodland habitat on limestone substrates. It lives in dense vegetation, sometimes under rocks.

References

Trissexodontidae
Gastropods described in 1991
Endemic fauna of Spain
Taxonomy articles created by Polbot